Solun is a town in the Hinggan League, of northeastern Inner Mongolia, People's Republic of China, located  northwest, by road, of the city of Ulan Hot. Its name in the Mongolian language means "hunted paddock or hunting paddock", which could derive from the fact that the Kangxi Emperor (ruled 1661–1722) of the Qing Dynasty often came here to hunt, after being impressed by the local topography, purple appearance of the environs, valleys enclosed by lofty mountains, and three rivers.

Geography and transport
The area's climate is harsh, with only 90 to 105 frost-free days per annum. The three rivers crossing through the town's administrative area are the Tao'er River (洮儿河), Hagan River (哈干河), and the Manchu River (满族河). Important transport links include the Baicheng–Alxan Railway (白阿铁路) and the Inner Mongolia Provincial Highway 203, connecting the town with Baicheng (Jilin) and Ulan Hot.

Demographics
Solun has a total population of 19,500, and the registered population (i.e. those with hukou permits) numbers 6,500. Around 40% of the population consists of Mongols, the other ethnic groups being the Han, Manchus, Koreans, Daurs, Oroqen, Evenks (Solon), and the Hui.

References

Township-level divisions of Inner Mongolia